Yana Mayu (Quechua yana black, mayu river, "black river")  is a  mountain in the Potosí mountain range of the Bolivian Andes. It is located in the Potosí Department, on the border of the Cornelio Saavedra Province, Chaqui Municipality, and the José María Linares Province, Puna Municipality. It is situated northeast of Jatun Kunturiri. The lakes named Kimsa Qucha ("three lakes", Quimsa Khocha) and Q'ara Qucha ("bare lake", Khara Khocha) lie at its feet.

References 

Mountains of Potosí Department